Roman Igorevich Voydel (born 16 July 1985) is a Russian professional footballer. He plays for FC Metallurg Lipetsk.

Club career
A product of FC Metallurg Lipetsk's youth system, Voydel began his professional career playing for the club in the Russian First Division and Russian Second Division. He made his debut in the Russian Premier League in 2007 for FC Luch-Energiya Vladivostok.

References

External links

1985 births
Sportspeople from Lipetsk
Living people
Russian footballers
Association football midfielders
FC Luch Vladivostok players
FC Baltika Kaliningrad players
FC Shinnik Yaroslavl players
Russian Premier League players
FC Metallurg Lipetsk players
FC Ufa players
FC Rotor Volgograd players
FC Armavir players
FC Tom Tomsk players